Hayden Lesley Panettiere (born August 21, 1989) is an American actress, model, and singer. She is best known for her lead roles as Claire Bennet on the NBC superhero series Heroes  and Juliette Barnes in the ABC/CMT musical drama series Nashville , the latter of which earned her two nominations for the Golden Globe Award for Best Supporting Actress – Series, Miniseries or Television Film. She also appears in the meta-slasher horror franchise Scream, portraying tomboy film geek Kirby Reed. 

A native of Palisades, New York, she first appeared on-screen in a commercial in 1990 at only 11 months old. However, her full-time acting career did not begin until 1994 when playing Sarah Roberts on the long-running ABC soap opera series One Life to Live from that year until 1997. She then went on to play Lizzie Spaulding on one of CBS's own soaps, Guiding Light from 1996 until 2000. For her work on Pixar film A Bug's Life (1998), she was nominated for a Young Artist Award and a Grammy Award, making her the 5th youngest artist ever to be nominated for a Grammy. Panettiere has also starred in the Disney football drama film Remember the Titans (2000), the final season of the Fox legal comedy-drama series Ally McBeal  (2002), the comedy-drama film Raising Helen (2004), the Disney Channel original patriotic film Tiger Cruise (2004), the horse racing comedy film Racing Stripes (2005), the figure skating drama film Ice Princess (2005), the romantic comedy film I Love You, Beth Cooper (2009), the true crime drama film Amanda Knox: Murder on Trial in Italy (2011), and the drama film Custody (2016). She also voiced the characters of Kairi and Xion in the video game series Kingdom Hearts (2002–2017) and Samantha "Sam" Giddings in the video game Until Dawn (2015).

Early life
Panettiere was born and partly raised in Palisades, New York. She is the daughter of Lesley R. Vogel, a former soap opera actress, and Alan Lee "Skip" Panettiere, a captain in the Fire Department of New York City. She had one younger brother, actor Jansen Panettiere. Her mother's family lives in Indiana.

After Panettiere attended South Orangetown Middle School in New York, she was homeschooled and had private tutors from grade nine to the completion of high school to accommodate her acting schedule.

Career

Acting

Television
Panettiere first appeared in commercials at the age of eleven months and 9hrs, beginning with an advertisement for a Playskool toy train. She landed a role as Sarah Roberts on the ABC soap opera One Life to Live from 1994 to 1997, which was followed by Lizzie Spaulding on the CBS soap opera Guiding Light in 1996, and again from 1997 to 2000. While on Guiding Light, Panettiere's character Lizzie battled leukemia. The Leukemia & Lymphoma Society gave her its Special Recognition Award for drawing the attention of daytime viewers to the disease, and for improving national awareness.

For her performance in Lifetime Television's 1999 TV movie If You Believe, she was nominated for the Young Artist Award for Young Actress Age Ten or Under in the category of Best Performance in a TV Movie or Pilot. Panettiere appeared on Fox's Ally McBeal as the title character's daughter, played the daughter of a man transitioning to female in HBO Films' Normal, had a recurring guest role on Malcolm in the Middle and guest starred in Law & Order: Special Victims Unit in two different roles.

Panettiere gained greater fame as Claire Bennet in the NBC series Heroes, which was created by Tim Kring, as a high school cheerleader with regenerative healing powers. Thanks to her role on Heroes, she became a regular on the science fiction convention circuit, invited to attend conventions around the world in 2007, including Gen Con, New York Comic Con, and Fan Expo Canada. Panettiere has complained that her acting options are sometimes limited because "people look at [her] as either the popular cheerleader type or just the blonde".

In early 2007, Panettiere appeared on the MTV show, Punk'd. The appearance was engineered by her mother and involved a male "fan" discussing her work with her, instigating a jealous reaction from the man's spouse. In April 2012, she hosted an episode of the new series.

In March 2012, it was announced Panettiere had been cast opposite Connie Britton on the ABC musical drama series Nashville, where she portrayed Juliette Barnes. The show reunited Panettiere with Burgess Jenkins (who appears in the first few episodes) from Remember the Titans. The show moved from ABC to CMT for its fifth and sixth seasons, and concluded its run on July 26, 2018.

Films
Panettiere made her feature film debut at the age of 9, albeit as a voice actor, for 1998's A Bug's Life, but her first released film was the same year's The Object of My Affection at the age of 8, in which she appears briefly as a mermaid in the school play in the opening scene. In 1999, she portrayed the girl on a sinking sailboat in Message in a Bottle. She played the role of Coach Yoast's daughter, Sheryl, in the 2000 Disney film Remember the Titans. In 2004, Disney Channel gave Panettiere her first starring roles as the daughter of actor Bill Pullman's character in Tiger Cruise, and as a teenage girl caught in a fantasy transitional realm alongside fellow child actor Ryan Kelley in fantasy film flick, The Dust Factory.

Her last major acting credit of 2004 was the role of adolescent niece to Kate Hudson's title character in Raising Helen, where Panettiere played the older sister to real life siblings Abigail and Spencer Breslin. In 2005, Panettiere played opposite Michelle Trachtenberg as an ice skating rival in Disney's Ice Princess and lead the screen again, this time, as budding jockey Channing Walsh in 2005's film Racing Stripes. In 2006, Panettiere played a cheerleader in Bring It On: All or Nothing and had a supporting role as Adelaide Bourbon in the 2007 independent film Shanghai Kiss.

In June 2007, she signed with the William Morris Agency, after previously being represented by the United Talent Agency. Forbes estimated that she earned $2 million in 2007.

In 2008, Panettiere appeared in the drama Fireflies in the Garden as a younger version of Emily Watson's character, Jane Lawrence. In September 2008, she appeared in a satirical video, a mock-PSA for Funny or Die titled "Hayden Panettiere PSA: Your Vote, Your Choice". In October, Panettiere appeared in another satirical PSA video on funnyordie.com titled "Vote for McCain: He's just like George Bush, except older and with a worse temper".

In July 2009, Panettiere starred in the teen comedy I Love You, Beth Cooper. In September 2010, she starred as Amanda Knox in the controversial Amanda Knox: Murder on Trial in Italy. Panettiere also provided the voice of Kate in 2010's Alpha and Omega.

In April 2011, Panettiere appeared in the Scream sequel, Scream 4, playing Kirby Reed. The film received mixed reviews, but she received acclaim for her role and was considered to be a highlight. The same year she replaced Anne Hathaway as the voice of Red for the animated sequel Hoodwinked Too! Hood vs. Evil. In 2012, The Forger, in which she played the role of Amber, was released direct to DVD (both this and Hoodwinked Too! Hood vs. Evil were made in 2009).

In April 2015, Panettiere joined the cast of Custody, alongside Viola Davis, whom she appeared with in 2006's The Architect.

In January 2022, Panettiere briefly reprised her role as Kirby Reed in the Scream 4 sequel Scream in a photograph used in the film, revealing the character to have survived the fourth film's events. Panettiere is credited with "Special Thanks" for the photograph's use as well as a voice cameo. On May 2022, it was announced Panettiere would be returning to the Scream franchise on its upcoming sixth installment, in what also marks her first on-screen film appearance since 2016 after a career hiatus.

Video games
Panettiere voiced Kairi in Kingdom Hearts and Kingdom Hearts II, although she was replaced by Alyson Stoner in several sequels; she briefly reprised her role in Kingdom Hearts Birth by Sleep and also voiced Xion in Kingdom Hearts 3D: Dream Drop Distance.

She voiced and modeled the character of Samantha "Sam" Giddings in Until Dawn, which was released on PlayStation 4 on August 25, 2015.

Singing
Panettiere was nominated for a Grammy Award in 1999 for A Bug's Life. In 2004, she recorded a song entitled "My Hero Is You" with a video for the Disney Channel film she starred in, Tiger Cruise, and "Someone Like You," a duet with Watt White for another film, The Dust Factory (also with an accompanying video). The next year she recorded a song entitled "I Fly" for the Disney film Ice Princess in which she also co-starred. She recorded a song for the Hollywood Records compilation Girl Next (2006) and another song entitled "Go to Girl" for Girl Next 2 (2007). Also in 2007, she sang the national anthem at A Capitol Fourth and recorded a cover for "Cruella De Vil" for Disneymania 5, "Try" for the Bridge to Terabithia soundtrack and a ballad called "I Still Believe" for Cinderella III: A Twist in Time.

Panettiere's first single not associated with an acting role, "Wake Up Call", was digitally released on August 5, 2008. The clothing brand Candie's announced that it was premiering an ad campaign for the single in late July. Candie's provided additional promotion for the single with a television advertisement and a music video. Sebastian Stan, who portrayed the brother of Panettiere's character in The Architect, played her boyfriend in the video.

She has recorded several songs for Nashville, which were released as singles and included on the show's soundtrack albums. She also made numerous concert appearances associated with the show's touring promotion. In 2013, Panettiere recorded a version of "The Fabric of My Life" for a Cotton Incorporated campaign.

Modeling
In late 2006, Neutrogena made Panettiere the cover girl for their new worldwide ad campaign; following in the footsteps of actresses Kristin Kreuk, Josie Bissett, Jennifer Love Hewitt, Mandy Moore, Mischa Barton, Gabrielle Union and Jennifer Freeman. In September 2007, Panettiere appeared in a Heroes-themed Got Milk? ad for which the photographs were shot by Annie Leibovitz. In February 2008, Kohl's announced that Panettiere would be their next Candie's spokesperson. From 2007 to 2008, Panettiere designed limited edition hand bags for Dooney & Bourke and modeled their bags in magazine ads.

In 2009, Panettiere was one of the celebrities featured in the coffee table book Room 23, produced by Diana Jenkins and photographed by Deborah Anderson.

Personal life

Panettiere began dating her Heroes co-star Milo Ventimiglia in December 2007, when she was 18 and he was 30. They broke up in February 2009.

In 2009, Panettiere met then-world heavyweight boxing champion Wladimir Klitschko at the book launch party for mutual acquaintance Diana Jenkins' Room 23, in which both Panettiere and Klitschko were featured. They soon began dating. Panettiere was ringside for Klitschko's knockout victory over Samuel Peter on September 11, 2010. In May 2011, she announced that they had split. Both cited the long-distance nature of their relationship as the reason, and said they would remain close friends. Panettiere confirmed reports that she and Klitschko had resumed their romantic relationship in an April 2013 interview. In October 2013, she announced her engagement to Klitschko. In December 2014, Panettiere gave birth to their daughter.

In 2015, she stated that following the birth of her daughter she experienced postpartum depression. In her September 28 appearance on Live with Kelly and Michael, she said that it's "scary and needs to be talked about". In October, Panettiere voluntarily checked into a facility for treatment, causing her to miss filming for a few episodes of Nashville. She returned to treatment in May 2016.

In August 2018, Panettiere's mother confirmed the couple had broken up again, remaining on friendly terms.
After she broke up with Klitschko, she started dating Brian Hickerson. In 2020, they broke up after he was arrested for corporal injury on a spouse/cohabitant, assault, and intimidating a witness (Panettiere). The charges stemmed from alleged incidents between May 2019 and June 2020. Despite this abuse and the statement, Panettiere and Hickerson have remained friends since he was released from jail.

Activism
In 2007, Panettiere became an official supporter of Ronald McDonald House Charities and is a member of their celebrity board, called the Friends of RMHC.

On October 31, 2007, Panettiere joined with The Whaleman Foundation to try to disrupt the annual dolphin hunt in Taiji, Wakayama, Japan. She was involved in a confrontation between Japanese fishermen and five other surfers of the group from Australia and the United States (including former Home and Away actress Isabel Lucas). The confrontation lasted more than ten minutes before the surfers were forced to return to the beach, after which they left the country. Parts of the confrontation can be seen on the award-winning Sundance Film Festival documentary film The Cove. The fishermen consider the condemnation as an attack on their culture.

On January 28, 2008, Panettiere handed a letter of protest to the Norwegian ambassador in the U.S. arguing that Norway should stop its hunt for whales. She also delivered a letter to the Japanese ambassador calling for the end of Japan's hunting of whales. At a 2007 Greenpeace event in Anchorage, Alaska, Panettiere defended aboriginal whaling, saying that there is a difference between commercial whaling and the whaling practiced by aboriginal tribes in the U.S.

In May 2008, Panettiere was involved in an eBay auction to benefit Save the Whales Again, a campaign of The Whaleman Foundation. The auction included tickets to a fundraising dinner hosted at the Hollywood restaurant Beso, owned by Eva Longoria, and a whale watching tour, with Panettiere, off the coast of Santa Barbara. The same month, during an interview with Teen Vogue, she explained how her fame gives her a platform for her activism: "The show [Heroes] put me in a place to speak for things that I'm passionate about."

In September 2008, Panettiere launched her own line of calfskin leather bags for the company Dooney & Bourke. In October, she delved into the presidential election, releasing a satirical public service announcement through the website Funny or Die. In this video, Panettiere mocked Republican candidate John McCain for his age and temper. She subsequently made clear her intention to vote for Barack Obama and urged other young people to vote.

Panettiere has long supported the statehood movement in the District of Columbia. In 2008 she appeared in a public service announcement with DC Shadow Senator Paul Strauss endorsing voting rights for Washington, DC. In 2011, DC Mayor Vincent Gray acknowledged Panettiere's advocacy on behalf of securing full representation in Congress for District of Columbia residents by naming a day in her honor. At the ceremony, Panettiere reflected, "It seems like such (an) unfathomable fact that, you know, it's taxation without representation in D.C., and that there's no democracy in our democracy, at the heart of it." She participated in Strauss' "51 Stars" campaign which aimed to get 51 celebrities to endorse making Washington, DC the 51st state.

She was also a teen ambassador for the Candie's Foundation, whose mission is to prevent teen pregnancy. On May 6, 2009, she participated in a town hall meeting in New York City alongside Bristol Palin and Major League Baseball pitcher Matt Garza on the issue of teen pregnancy.

On December 6, 2013, Panettiere and her then-fiancé Wladimir Klitschko visited the Euromaidan protests in Kiev, Ukraine. Wladimir's brother, Vitali, was one of the leading figures of the protests.

In July 2020, Panettiere advocated for victims of domestic abuse to come forward and share their stories, specifically after she herself had gone through abuse.

Filmography

Film

Television

Video games

Music videos

Discography

Singles

Other charted songs

ADid not enter the Hot 100 but charted on Bubbling Under Hot 100 Singles

Music videos

Soundtrack appearances

Compilation albums

Awards and nominations

References

External links

 

1989 births
Living people
21st-century American actresses
21st-century American singers
21st-century American women singers
Activists from New York (state)
Actresses from New York (state)
American child actresses
American child singers
American country singer-songwriters
American women country singers
American female models
American film actresses
American people of Italian descent
American soap opera actresses
American television actresses
American video game actresses
American voice actresses
American women environmentalists
Audiobook narrators
Female models from New York (state)
Hollywood Records artists
People from Palisades, New York
Singer-songwriters from New York (state)
Walt Disney Records artists